Parent article: List of gay, lesbian or bisexual people;
Siblings:

This is a partial list of confirmed famous people who were or are gay, lesbian or bisexual. Famous people who are simply rumored to be gay, lesbian or bisexual, are not listed.

The historical concept and definition of sexual orientation varies and has changed greatly over time; for example the word "gay" wasn't used to describe sexual orientation until the mid 20th century. A number of different classification schemes have been used to describe sexual orientation since the mid-19th century, and scholars have often defined the term "sexual orientation" in divergent ways. Indeed, several studies have found that much of the research about sexual orientation has failed to define the term at all, making it difficult to reconcile the results of different studies. However, most definitions include a psychological component (such as the direction of an individual's erotic desire) and/or a behavioural component (which focuses on the sex of the individual's sexual partner/s). Some prefer to simply follow an individual's self-definition or identity. See homosexuality and bisexuality for criteria that have traditionally denoted lesbian, gay and bisexual (LGB) people.

The high prevalence of people from the West on this list may be due to societal attitudes towards homosexuality. The Pew Research Center's 2013 Global Attitudes Survey found that there is "greater acceptance in more secular and affluent countries", with "publics in 39 countries [having] broad acceptance of homosexuality in North America, the European Union, and much of Latin America, but equally widespread rejection in predominantly Muslim nations and in Africa, as well as in parts of Asia and in Russia. Opinion about the acceptability of homosexuality is divided in Israel, Poland and Bolivia".  Americans are divided – a majority (60 percent) believes homosexuality should be accepted, while 33 percent disagree.

M

References

Lists of LGBT-related people